Present on the local market since 4 July 1990, bank was founded on the initiative of few entrepreneurs with professional experience in the financial and banking field, which set up an independent bank, oriented towards serving the SME sector.

In 2007, the majority shareholder of the bank became Groupe Société Générale, which contributed to the development of the product portfolio and the growth of performance indicators for twelve years, consolidating a professional team and reaching the top position in the financial system of the country.

On July 25, 2019, OTP Bank Nyrt has acquired the majority stake 96.69% held by Groupe Société Générale held in BC "Mobiasbanca - Groupe Société Générale" S.A. The new official name of the bank is OTP Bank.

History
Main historical milestones:
1990, July 4 – was set up as an independent bank with the legal status of Limited Liability Company
1995 – One of the first bank allowed on the securities' market
1996 – One of the first bank to benefit from credit lines granted by International Financial Organizations
1996 – The Bank changed its legal status to Joint Stock Company
1996 – Member of SWIFT international payment system
1997 – 32.45% of share capital was acquired by the investment fund Development Capital Corporation, who remained to be the major shareholder of the Bank (63.68%)
2002 – Member of the “Europay International” payment system
2003 – The automatic banking system implementation
2005 – First bank to launch a consumer-loan and a credit card
2007 – The Bank has been purchased by Groupe Société Générale (95,35%)
2008 – The bank changes the official name to CB “Mobiasbanca – Groupe Société Générale” S.A.
2008 – Capital increase of the Bank and coming of new strategic shareholders (BRD – Groupe Société Générale) and EBRD (European Bank for Reconstruction and Development). The share of Societe Generale decreased as a result of this transaction and as of the end of 2008 effectively represents 67.85%.
2008 – Principal member of MasterCard
2009 – Implementation of telerecovery service
2009 – MasterCard  certification of cards with microchip
2011 – Simplu Finance project launch
2011 – First collection of cards created exclusively for women Chérie Chérie
2012 – Launch of the Universal Desk concept
2012 – Launch of new Call-Center (Contactell)
2012 – MobiasInfo sms messaging service launch
2012 – Launch of MasterCard Secure Code - secured payments over the Internet
2013 – International certificate ISO 9001: 2008 "Quality Management Systems. Requirements", being the first bank in the country holding such a certificate
2013 – IP telephony implementation
2014 – New range of bank cards in the international payment system MasterCard - banking card endowed with EMV (embedded chip)
2014 – Opening of the new Training Centre and Branch School
2016 – Launch of VISA cards
2017 – First Mortgage Center opened in Moldova
2019 – Purchase by OTP Bank
2020 – 30th anniversary of the Bank
2021 – the Bank finalizes the rebranding process and becomes OTP Bank S.A. (OTP Bank, Moldova).

References

External links

Banks in Moldova
Economy of Moldova

Banks established in 1990
1990 establishments in the Moldavian Soviet Socialist Republic